The 1927 Treaty of Jeddah, formally the Treaty between His Majesty and His Majesty the King of the Hejaz and of Nejd and Its Dependencies was signed between the United Kingdom and Ibn Saud. It recognised the independence of Ibn Saud and sovereignty over what was then known as the Kingdom of Hejaz and Nejd. The two regions were unified into the Kingdom of Saudi Arabia in 1932.  In return, Ibn Saud agreed to stop his forces from attacking and harassing neighbouring British protectorates.

The Treaty superseded the Treaty of Darin (1915).

It was published in Treaty Series No. 25 (1927), Command 2951 and was slightly modified by two further exchanges of Notes in 1936 (Treaty Series No. 10 (1937) Command 5380) and 1943 (Treaty Series No. 13 (1947), Command 7064).

References

1927 in Saudi Arabia
Jeddah (1927)
Treaties concluded in 1927
Treaties of the Kingdom of Hejaz and Nejd
History of Jeddah
Saudi Arabia–United Kingdom relations
Anti-slavery treaties
Slavery in Asia